News from Nowhere is the 13th studio album by British/Australian soft rock duo Air Supply released in 1995. The album marks a turn for the band from pop to more adult-oriented themes. The single "Someone" reached #60 in US Adult Contemporary charts. The interpretation of the song "Unchained Melody" and single "Always" both have become favourites in the band's repertoire.

Reception 

AllMusic's Stephen Thomas Erlewine felt it was a "carefully crafted piece of adult contemporary pop, but it lacks memorable songs and suffers from several uninspired performances."

Track listing 
 "Someone" (Guy Allison, Graham Russell) - 5:12
 "Just Between the Lines" (Graham Russell, Rex Goh) - 4:03
 "Heart of the Rose" (Graham Russell) - 5:36
 "Unchained Melody" (Alex North, Hy Zaret) - 3:43
 "Feel for Your Love" (Graham Russell, Billy Sherwood, Marty Walsh) - 5:21
 "News from Nowhere" (Graham Russell) - 6:10
 "Always" (Guy Allison, Graham Russell, Michael Sherwood) - 4:12
 "Can't Stop the Rain" (Guy Allison, Graham Russell) - 4:17
 "Primitive Man" (Guy Allison, Graham Russell) - 5:04
 "Spirit of Love" (Graham Russell, Benny Andersson, Björn Ulvaeus, Billy Sherwood) - 4:30
 "The Way I Feel" (Guy Allison, Graham Russell) - 4:39
 "I Know You Better Than You Think" (Graham Russell, Johann Sebastian Bach) - 4:02

Personnel 

 Russell Hitchcock – lead vocals (1–11), harmony vocals (4)
 Graham Russell – lead vocals (1–3, 5, 6, 8–11), acoustic guitar (1, 3–6, 10, 11), nylon guitar (2), harmony vocals (4), additional nylon guitar (8)
 Michael Thompson – electric guitar (1, 8), guitar (7), dobro (8), nylon guitar (8)
 Marty Walsh – guitar (3, 4, 9), electric guitar (5, 10)
 Guy Allison – acoustic piano (1–4, 6, 8–10), keyboards (1, 4, 8–10), African drums (1), string arrangements (8)
 Hans Zermuehlen – additional keyboards (3), harmonium (11), strings (11)
 Michael Ruff – Hammond B3 organ (5)
 Rob Mullins – additional keyboards (10)
 Larry Antonino – bass (1, 3, 6–10)
 Billy Sherwood – bass (4, 5), drum programming (5), backing vocals (5, 10), acoustic piano (7), keyboards (7), electric guitar (10)
 Paulinho da Costa – percussion (1, 6, 8)
 Mark Towner Williams – additional percussion (1), talking drum (1), drums (3, 4, 7–10), percussion (5, 8)
 Martin Tillman – cello (1, 8, 10)
 Lili Haydn – violin (8, 10)
 John Philip Shenale – string arrangements (2, 3, 7, 9)
 Scott Smalley – string conductor (2, 3, 7, 9)
 Michael Sherwood – backing vocals (1, 10, 11)
 C.C. White – backing vocals (8)

Production 
 Producer – Graham Russell
 Engineered and Mixed by Alejandro Rodriguez
 Strings recorded by Glen Niebaur
 Assistant Recording – Pat Karamian, Manny Marroquin, James McIlvery, Krish Sharma and Andy Warwick.
 Mastered by George Marino at Sterling Sound (New York, NY).
 Art Direction and Design – Heather Laurie
 Photography – Chris Reisig and Lisa Taylor

References 

1995 albums
Air Supply albums
Giant Records (Warner) albums
Albums produced by Graham Russell